Yesan is a county in South Chungcheong Province, South Korea.  Famous people from Yesan include independence fighter Yoon Bong-Gil.

Sudeoksa, a head temple of the Jogye Order of Korean Buddhism, is located on the southern slopes of Deoksungsan in Deoksan-myeon, Yesan County. Its main hall is daeungjeon, Korea's oldest wooden building and National Treasure 49.

In 2009, Yesan was designated a "slow city," one in which traditional cultures and communities are preserved.

Climate
Yesan has a humid continental climate (Köppen: Dwa), but can be considered a borderline humid subtropical climate (Köppen: Cwa) using the  isotherm.

Transportation
 Yesan Citybus

Sister cities

Domestic
 Seocho-gu, Seoul
 Seongbuk-gu, Seoul
 Yeonsu-gu, Incheon
 Anyang, Gyeonggi

International
 Knoxville, Tennessee, United States

Notable people
 Park Hyo-shin; singer
 Yun Dae-nyeong; Author
 Yun Bong-gil; fighter for independence
 Baek Jong-won; food researcher, businessman, entertainer.

See also
Sapgyo

References

External links
Official government website

 
Counties of South Chungcheong Province